The Aided High School is one of the oldest secondary schools in  the Sylhet region of Bangladesh, having been established in 1928. Economist Saifur Rahman was one of the notable students of the school. It is situated in the Zindabazar neighbourhood, in the center of Sylhet. It was previously known as Nawab Taleb Bengal School.

Staff 
Headmaster:  Md Shamsher Ali

Notable alumni
 Alaur Rahman - singer
 Moulvi Syed Abdul Majid - lawyer, politician, entrepreneur, educationist
 Saifur Rahman -economist 
Abu Jayed Chowdhury Rahi - Cricketer
Abdur Rahim (politician)
Roki Roy (Entrepreneur) 
Md Rihat
Mohammad Mujahidul Islam Abid
MD Joshim Hawladar

References

External links

Schools in Sylhet District
High schools in Bangladesh
Educational institutions established in 1928
1928 establishments in India